Central Buses was a bus company based in Birmingham, England.

History
Central Buses was founded in September 2003 by 16-year-old Geoff Cross, in partnership with his father Peter.

Later, a separate arm of the company was created. Centrad was created under the CEN Group brand, which Central Buses also joined. This supplies electronic equipment to the bus industry.

Many of the services operated by Central Buses were operated under contract to Transport for West Midlands. All buses were equipped to use prepaid fare cards.

In February 2018, Central Buses was purchased by Rotala with its 23 services and 31 buses taken over by its Diamond West Midlands subsidiary. Operations ceased at the conclusion of services on 24 February 2018.

Fleet
As of February 2018, the fleet consisted of 31 buses. Fleet livery was red and grey.

References

External links
Official website

Former bus operators in Shropshire
Former bus operators in the West Midlands (county)
Former bus operators in Worcestershire
Transport companies established in 2003
Transport companies disestablished in 2018
2003 establishments in England
2018 disestablishments in England
British companies established in 2003
British companies disestablished in 2018